GCW may refer to:
 Game Changer Wrestling, an American professional wrestling promotion
 Garden City Western Railway
 GCW Zero, a video game console
 Georgia Championship Wrestling, a former American professional wrestling promotion
 Glan Conwy railway station, in Wales
 Grand Canyon West Airport, serving Peach Springs, Arizona
 Great Canadian Wrestling, a Canadian professional wrestling promotion
 Gross combined weight rating
 Galactic Civil War, a conflict in the Star Wars Original Trilogy